Les Taylor may refer to:

Les Taylor (basketball), American basketball player
Les Taylor (cricketer) (born 1953), English cricketer
Les Taylor (footballer) (born 1956), English footballer
Les Taylor (singer) (born 1948), American musician formerly of the band Exile
Les Squizzy Taylor (1888-1927), Australian gangster
Lesley Taylor (judge), a judge of the Supreme Court of Victoria

See also
Leslie Taylor (1894–1977), New Zealand cricketer
Lesley Taylor, producer of Caillou's Holiday Movie
Taylor (surname)